Dr. Mamoun Fandy is an Egyptian-born American scholar. He is president of the think tank London Global Strategy Institute, a former senior fellow at the Baker Institute, the United States Institute of Peace, and at the International Institute for Strategic Studies in London. Before that Fandy was a research professor of politics at the Center for Contemporary Arab Studies at the School of Foreign Service of Georgetown University, as well as of Arab politics at the National Defense University. He is frequently seen on American television, and is a columnist for Al-Ahram and the Asharq Al-Awsat.

In his 2007 book (Un)Civil War of Words: Media and Politics in the Arab World, Fandy called Al Jazeera "the Muslim Brotherhood channel", noting that it glorified Muslim Brotherhood founder Hassan Al-Bannah in a two-part documentary in 2006.
He is currently living in London with his wife and children.

Books
2001 Saudi Arabia and the Politics of Dissent (hardcover ; paperback )
2004 The Road to Kandahar: On the Trail of bin Laden and Zawaheri
2007 (Un)Civil War of Words: Media and Politics in the Arab World
2009 Kuwait and a New Concept of International Politics

References

Year of birth missing (living people)
Living people
Middle Eastern studies in the United States
Walsh School of Foreign Service faculty